John Bundy Brown (May 31, 1805 – June 10, 1881) was an American industrialist from Portland, Maine who owned the Portland Sugar Company, which processed molasses imported from the Caribbean into sugar.

Early life
Brown was born on May 31, 1805 in Lancaster, New Hampshire to Titus Olcott Brown and Susannah (Bundy) Brown. He attended public schools and the Hebron Academy. He began working at a young age and eventually became the partner of a prosperous grocery business.

Business career
Brown entered the sugar business in 1845 when he, his brother-in-law Philip Greely Jr., and George F. Guild owned a sugar house in Portland. Greely and Guild were heavily involved in the West Indies trade and imported a large quantity of molasses. This company was involved in the importation of slave-produced sugar from the Caribbean and the processing of it into rum and molasses. After Greely and Guild's firm company failed, Brown took over the entire business. The business was not successful in its early years because it was unable to produce the required granulation using known processes. However, it became lucrative after Brown's agent, Dependence H. Furbush, developed a process that used steam power to extract a sugar from molasses. In 1855, Brown, Furbush, and Brown's son Philip H. Brown chartered the Portland Sugar Company. 

Brown was Maine's wealthiest resident and Portland's largest landowner. He owned over 400-plus acres in Portland's West End. The Western Promenade was built on Brown's land. 17 of his properties, including the Portland Sugar House, were destroyed in the 1866 Portland Fire. Brown rebuilt his businesses, including a new sugar house and the Falmouth Hotel, and constructed a number of mansions, including his own Bramhall. J.B. Brown & Sons, founded by Brown, continues to own, manage and develop commercial properties in Portland. The J.B. Brown Memorial Building on Congress Street was constructed by Brown's sons after his death and was named in his honor.

Brown was the president of the Portland Savings Bank, Portland Board of Trade, and Maine General Hospital, an incorporator of the St. Lawrence and Atlantic Railroad, a trustee of Bowdoin College, and a director of a number of other businesses, including the Maine Central Railroad Company.

Brown was a member of the Whig and Republican parties. He was a member of the Maine Senate in 1857 and a presidential elector in 1860.

Family
Brown married Ann Matilda Greely, daughter of Portland’s Philip Greely on September 30, 1830. They had five children, Philip, James, Ellen, John Marshall, and Matilda. Two of Brown's children married children of Nathan Clifford - Ellen Brown married William H. Clifford and Philip Brown married Fanny Clifford.

Brown's descendants include Nathan Clifford Brown and Howard H. Dana Jr. Brown died on June 10, 1881 at his home in Portland.

References

1805 births
1881 deaths
American industrialists
Hebron Academy alumni
People from Lancaster, New Hampshire
Businesspeople from Portland, Maine
Businesspeople in the sugar industry
Maine state senators
Maine Republicans
Maine Whigs